In the 2004–05 season Panathinaikos played for 46th consecutive time in Greece's top division, Alpha Ethniki. They also competed in UEFA Champions League, UEFA Cup and Greek Cup. Season started with Zdeněk Ščasný as team manager.

Squad
As of 24 February 2007.

Competitions

Alpha Ethniki

Classification

UEFA Champions League

Group E

UEFA Cup

Knockout stage

Round of 32

Team kit

Notes

References

External links
 Panathinaikos FC official website

Panathinaikos F.C. seasons
Panathinaikos FC season